The Bareilly Metro is a rapid transit system planned in the Indian city of Bareilly, Uttar Pradesh. The complete system will consist of 6 Metro Rail lines running throughout the metropolitan area of the city and connecting it with nearby satellite towns.

History
Bareilly is a major city in Western Uttar Pradesh and located near the Uttarakhand border. It is 7th largest city of Uttar Pradesh in terms of population. It is situated almost halfway between Delhi, the national capital and Lucknow, the state capital. It also provide an outer gateway for the people of Kumaon region of the neighbouring state of Uttarakhand. The city also houses some of the best hospitals in state so many people from surrounding regions visit this city daily to seek medical benefit. This city is also one of the major commercial centres in north India, so heavily burdened with traffic in its narrow lanes and overcrowded roads the Government of Uttar Pradesh decided to introduce some form of mass rapid transit in the city.

References

 
 
 

Transport in Bareilly
Proposed rapid transit in Uttar Pradesh